This Et Al were an English alternative rock band, from Leeds and Bradford, West Yorkshire, England. They were active between 2002 and 2008. Their sound was compared to My Bloody Valentine, ...And You Will Know Us By The Trail Of Dead, Queens of the Stone Age, Interpol, and The Stills.

Former members
 Neil 'Wu' Widdop – 
 Ben Holden – 
 Gavin Bailey – 
 Steve Wilson – 
 Chris Wall –

Career
This Et Al formed in Bradford in November 2002. All of their releases enjoyed airtime on MTV2, as well as BBC Radio 1 and XFM. They toured with Minus The Bear, Scarling., Amusement Parks On Fire and ¡Forward, Russia!, and also appeared at the Download Festival and Leeds Festival. After a run of sold out singles and heavy touring for several years, the band released their debut album, Baby Machine, in a limited pressing in 2006 before a wider release on 9 April 2007. After a couple of member changes and a tour in Germany, the band released Figure Eight EP (19 May 2008), followed by a retrospective collection entitled B-Sides & Rarities. The group disbanded in June 2008 following a run of internal disagreements.

Post-This Et Al, frontman Wu went on to record and release his solo project, Stalking Horse, as well as performing as part of Department M with former Grammatics member Owen Brinley. Guitarist Ben formed Bradford-based band Dolphins in 2009 and currently plays in alternative indie band, Big Love. Drummer Steve Wilson, after a stint in fellow Leeds act, Dinosaur Pile-Up, played for the London based band Japanese Voyeurs till 2012 before later joining Leeds-based metal band Hawk Eyes. Former bassist Gavin Bailey is now the frontman of synthpop act Secret Circuits.

The band, featuring the original lineup, reunited briefly for a one-off show with ¡Forward, Russia! at the Brudenell Social Club in Leeds on 30 November 2013, to celebrate the venue's 100th anniversary.

Discography

Studio albums
 Baby Machine 
 B-Sides & Rarities

EPs
 Figure Eight EP

Singles
 "He Shoots Presidents" 
 "You've Driven For Miles (& Not Remembered a Thing)" 
 "Wardens" 
 "Template" 
 "Sabbatical" 
 "Of National Importance"

References

External links

Alternative rock groups from Leeds
Indie rock groups from Leeds
Musical groups established in 2002
Musical groups disestablished in 2008
2002 establishments in England
2008 disestablishments in England